The Cornwell Scout Badge is an award for youth members of The Scout Association of the United Kingdom and some other Scouting associations within the Commonwealth of Nations. It is awarded in recognition of devotion to duty, courage and endurance. The badge was created in memory of a boy sailor and Scout, Jack Cornwell, who was posthumously awarded the Victoria Cross after he was mortally wounded at the Battle of Jutland in 1916.

History

John Travers Cornwell, known as "Jack", was a 16-year-old Boy Seaman First Class on board the Royal Navy light cruiser, HMS Chester. At the Battle of Jutland on 31 May 1916, Chester came under heavy fire from four German cruisers that she had encountered in poor visibility, incurring numerous casualties among the exposed crew members working the guns. Jack's captain later wrote; "Boy (1st Class) John Travers Cornwell of the Chester was mortally wounded early in the action. He nevertheless remained standing alone at a most exposed post, quietly awaiting orders till the end of the action, with the gun's crew dead and wounded all round him".
 
Following Jack's death in Grimsby on 2 June, the Daily Sketch newspaper reported that he had been buried in a mass grave near his family home in Manor Park, Essex (now Greater London). The press coverage ensured that Jack became a popular hero; his body was exhumed and re-buried with full military honours on 29 July and he was awarded the Victoria Cross on 15 September.

Because Jack Cornwell had been an enthusiastic member of his local Scout troop, Scouts had participated in his funeral procession and lined the route. Sir Robert Baden-Powell, the founder of the Scout movement, posthumously awarded Jack the Bronze Cross, Scouting's "highest possible award for gallantry". In August 1916, the Scouts' Headquarters Gazette announced that a "Cornwell Memorial Fund" had been set up to provide apprenticeships or scholarships to those who qualified as "Cornwell Scouts" and suggested a donation of one penny from each member. On 14 September, the criteria for the Cornwell Scout Badge were announced. In the original scheme, eligible boys had to be First Class Scouts, have earned certain key proficiency badges and have gained an award for bravery or "have undergone great suffering in a heroic manner". A short-lived alternative to these last requirements was to "pass a test in physical courage, such as high diving, boxing or gymnastics".

The first recipient of the Cornwell Scout Badge was Patrol Leader Arthur Shepherd, who had assisted the Coastguard during the wreck of the hospital ship, HMHS Rohilla, in a severe gale at Whitby in October 1914. His duties had included running messages and fetching rescue equipment along a steep narrow ledge, on a cliff that was being washed by high waves. He had also led his patrol in assisting the Coastguard during the German bombardment of Whitby in December of the same year. The badge, which was actually the manufacturer's sample and the only one in existence at the time, was presented by Baden-Powell at a rally in Middlesbrough in December 1916, in front of the Archbishop of York and 3,000 Scouts.

Current usage

In The Scout Association of the United Kingdom, the award of the Cornwell Scout Badge is restricted to Beaver Scouts, Cub Scouts, Scouts, Explorer Scouts and Scout Network Members. Candidates must have displayed "pre-eminently high character and devotion to duty, together with great courage and endurance". In 2013, four British members were awarded the Cornwell Scout Badge (one posthumously), out of a total youth membership of 433,850.

The Cornwell Memorial Fund still operates, and will make a grant to the Scout Group of the recipient of any of the Scout gallantry or meritorious awards, including recipients of the Cornwell Scout Badge, "in order that they can undertake an activity which involves and benefits both parties."

In Scouts Canada, The Jack Cornwell Decoration is awarded on very similar criteria to its British counterpart. In Scouts New Zealand, the Cornwell Scout Badge is available to youth members under the age of 19 years, the upper age limit of the Venturer Section.

References

External links
Patrol Leader Arthur Shepherd - the story of Arthur Shepherd, the first recipient of the Cornwell Scout Badge.

Scout and Guide awards
The Scout Association